Idris Jamal Reynolds (born February 20, 1979) is an American former college and professional football player who was a defensive end in the National Football League (NFL) for three seasons during the early 2000s.  He played college football for Florida State University, and was recognized as a consensus All-American.  The Green Bay Packers chose him in the first round of the 2001 NFL Draft.

Early years

Reynolds was born in Augusta, Georgia.  He attended Aiken High School in Aiken, South Carolina. His brother, Rashad Reynolds, helped Aiken High School win a high school football state championship in 1992.

College career

Reynolds attended Florida State University, and played defensive end for coach Bobby Bowden's Florida State Seminoles football team from 1997 to 2000.  Following his 2000 senior season, he earned first-team All-Atlantic Coast Conference (ACC) honors, and was recognized as a unanimous first-team All-American. He also won the Lombardi Award, and was a finalist for College Football News' Defensive Player of the Year award.  As a senior, Reynolds accumulated a career high 12 sacks and 58 tackles.

Professional

His strong college pedigree led the Green Bay Packers to select him with the 10th overall selection in the 2001 NFL Draft. The Packers acquired the draft pick from the Seattle Seahawks, in exchange for Matt Hasselbeck and the 17th overall selection in the draft.

Injuries and the emergence of Kabeer Gbaja-Biamila, however, prevented Reynolds from playing the first ten games of his rookie season. He finished his rookie season with four tackles and two sacks. On July 8, 2004, after two seasons in which Reynolds totaled only three sacks and played in only 13 games, the Packers attempted to trade Reynolds to the Indianapolis Colts. However, the trade was declared void after Reynolds failed the Colts' physical examination. Ten days later, the Packers released Reynolds, and he was picked up by the Cleveland Browns, who hoped to salvage the still-young Reynolds' career. Reynolds was cut by the Browns before the beginning of the 2004 season, and has not played in the NFL since.

References

External links
  Milwaukee Journal-Sentinel Online: Jamal Reynolds Scouting Report
  Packers press release: Reynolds Trade to Indianapolis Voided Due To Failed Physical

1979 births
Living people
All-American college football players
American football defensive ends
Florida State Seminoles football players
Green Bay Packers players
Players of American football from Augusta, Georgia